A double-decker is a vehicle that has two levels for passengers or cargo, one deck above the other. Such vehicles include:
 Aerial tramway
 Bilevel rail car a rail passenger vehicle consisting of 2 levels
 Bombardier BiLevel Coach
 Bombardier MultiLevel Coach
 Dome car
 Double-deck aircraft
 Double-deck elevator
 Double-decker bus
 Double-decker tram
 Superliner (railcar)
 Autorack (US) or car transporter (UK), a railway vehicle for transporting cars or other road vehicles
 Car carrier trailer or auto carrier, a road trailer for transporting cars or other road vehicles
 Two-decker is a sailing ship with 2 decks armed with cannon.

A double-decker may also refer to:
 Double Decker (chocolate bar)
 Double-decker sandwich, such as a club sandwich or Dagwood sandwich, with two layers of meat and condiments sandwiched between three pieces of bread
 A multi-level roadway such as those found in Chicago
 A multi-level bridge
 A double-decker outhouse
 Double Decker, a 1984 Hong Kong film
 Double Decker (2011 film), a 2011 Kannada-language film 
 Double Decker! Doug & Kirill, a 2018 Japanese anime series